When The Village Music Plays on Sunday Nights is a 1953 West German romance film directed by Rudolf Schündler and starring Rudolf Prack, Ingeborg Körner and Walter Müller. It is a heimatfilm shot in Gevacolor.

It was made at the Tempelhof Studios in Berlin and on location in the Black Forest. The film's sets were designed by the art directors Willi Herrmann and Heinrich Weidemann.

Cast

References

Bibliography 
 Davidson, John & Hake, Sabine. Framing the Fifties: Cinema in a Divided Germany. Berghahn Books, 2007.

External links 
 

1953 films
1950s romance films
German romance films
West German films
1950s German-language films
Films directed by Rudolf Schündler
Gloria Film films
Films shot at Tempelhof Studios
1950s German films